
Leslie R. Lemon (January 19, 1947 – May 29, 2020) was an American meteorologist bridging research and forecasting with expertise in weather radar, particularly regarding severe convective storms. Lemon was, along with Charles A. Doswell III, a seminal contributor to the modern conception of the supercell which was first identified by Keith Browning, and he developed the Lemon technique to estimate updraft strength and thunderstorm organization (in highly sheared environments) also as a continuation of Browning's work.

Early life 
Lemon's interest in severe storms was triggered in earnest after he witnessed the F5 Ruskin Heights tornado on May 20, 1957, which caused light damage to his family's home and severe damage very nearby. Lemon studied meteorology at the University of Kansas (KU) and the University of Oklahoma (OU), graduating with a B.S. from the University of Oklahoma in 1970.

Career
Lemon embarked on graduate school studies but being the Vietnam era he wasn't able to continue and he joined the NOAA Commissioned Corps. Afterward, in addition to developing the Lemon technique at the Techniques Development Unit (TDU) of the National Severe Storms Forecast Center (NSSFC) and his work on the supercell thunderstorm, Lemon was a major developer of the WSR-88D or "NEXRAD". In 1976 NOAA bestowed a Special Achievement Award for his co-discovery of tornado vortex signature (TVS).

He has since taught widely on the subjects of radar and severe convective storms throughout the United States and internationally. At Lockheed Martin, Lemon was a key developer of its microburst prediction radar. Lemon also worked at Unisys and other companies during his career and operated a forensic and consulting meteorology company.

Lemon was president of the National Weather Association (NWA) in 2001 and served on a National Academy of Sciences National Research Council (NAS NRC) committee on "Weather Radar Technology Beyond NEXRAD" that same year.

He also has expertise in storm damage surveying and surveyed the first documented tornado in Romania while doing radar work there.

Death 
Lemon died on May 29, 2020, at the age of 73. He is survived by his wife and three children.

See also 
 Donald W. Burgess
 Jon Davies
 Ron Przybylinski
 Terminal Doppler Weather Radar (TDWR)
 Low level windshear alert system (LLWAS)

References

External links 
 L.R. Lemon Meteorological Services
 
 

American meteorologists
University of Oklahoma alumni
1947 births
2020 deaths
National Weather Service people